Benjamin Franklin Peay (September 19, 1931 – April 9, 1988), better known as Brook Benton, was an American singer and songwriter who was popular with rock and roll, rhythm and blues, and pop music audiences during the late 1950s and early 1960s, with hits such as "It's Just a Matter of Time" and "Endlessly", many of which he co-wrote.

He made a comeback in 1970 with the ballad "Rainy Night in Georgia." Benton scored over 50 Billboard chart hits as an artist, and also wrote hits for other performers.

Early life and career
When Benton was young, he enjoyed gospel music, wrote songs and sang in a Methodist church choir in  Lugoff, South Carolina, where his father, Willie Peay, was choir master. In 1948, he went to New York to pursue his music career, going in and out of gospel groups, such as The Langfordaires, The Jerusalem Stars and The Golden Gate Quartet. Returning to his home state, he joined an R&B singing group, The Sandmen, and went back to New York to get a big break with his group. The Sandmen had limited success and their label, Okeh Records, decided to push Peay as a solo artist, changing his name to Brook Benton, apparently at the suggestion of label executive Marv Halsman.

Brook earned a good living by writing songs and co-producing albums. He wrote songs for artists such as Nat King Cole, Clyde McPhatter (for whom he co-wrote the hit "A Lover's Question") and Roy Hamilton. He eventually released his first minor hit, "A Million Miles from Nowhere", before switching to the Mercury label, which would eventually bring him major success. He also appeared in the 1957 film Mister Rock And Roll, with Alan Freed.

Success
In 1959,  he finally made his breakthrough with hits like "It's Just a Matter of Time" and "Endlessly". "It's Just a Matter of Time" peaked at No. 3 on the United States Billboard Hot 100 chart, sold over one million copies and was awarded a gold disc by the RIAA. "Endlessly" made it to No. 12. Both of the first two hits were written by Benton with Clyde Otis. They were originally offered to Nat King Cole, but when Otis became an A&R manager and producer at Mercury, he convinced Benton to sign with the label and record them himself, while asking Cole not to record the songs as planned. Benton followed this success with a series of hits, including "So Many Ways" (No. 6), "Hotel Happiness" (No. 3), "Think Twice" (No. 11), "Kiddio" (No. 7), and "The Boll Weevil Song" (No. 2). In 1960, he had two top 10 hit duets with Dinah Washington: "Baby (You've Got What It Takes)" (No. 5) and "A Rockin' Good Way (To Mess Around and Fall in Love)" (No. 7).

In the mid 1960s, Benton recorded for RCA Records and Reprise Records with minimal commercial success. Then, in 1968, he signed with Cotillion Records, a subsidiary of Atlantic Records, where, the following year, he enjoyed his last major hit with "Rainy Night in Georgia", written by Tony Joe White and produced and arranged by Arif Mardin, a million-seller which topped the Billboard R&B chart. Benton recorded a total of five albums with Mardin, including a gospel album, during his stay at Cotillion.

Benton eventually charted a total of 49 singles on the Billboard Hot 100, with other songs charting on Billboards rhythm and blues, easy listening, and Christmas music charts. The last album made by Benton was Fools Rush In, which was released posthumously in 2005. He also had records released on various other labels, including All-Platinum, Brut, Olde Worlde, Stax and Groove Records.

Death
Weakened from spinal meningitis, Benton died of pneumonia in Queens, New York City, at the age of 56 on April 9, 1988.  He was survived by his wife, Mary Benton, and six children: Brook Jr., Vanessa, Roy, Isreal, Gerald and Benjamin, all of Queens.

Discography

Albums

Singles

References

External links
 Soulwalking.co.uk – Brook Benton Fan Page
 VH1.com – Artist Listing
 Tsimon.com – Brook Benton Fan Page
 "Brook Benton Biography"
 Brook Benton at Discogs
 

1931 births
1988 deaths
20th-century African-American male singers
African-American songwriters
All Platinum artists
American crooners
American male songwriters
Atlantic Records artists
Deaths from meningitis
Infectious disease deaths in New York (state)
Mercury Records artists
Neurological disease deaths in New York (state)
People from Lugoff, South Carolina
RCA Victor artists
Songwriters from South Carolina